Lanark was a royal burgh that returned one commissioner to the Parliament of Scotland and to the Convention of Estates.

After the Acts of Union 1707, Lanark, Linlithgow, Peebles and Selkirk formed the Lanark district of burghs, returning one member between them to the House of Commons of Great Britain.

List of burgh commissioners

 1661–63, 1665 convention, 1667 convention, 1669–74: Patrick Bissett, bailie 
 1678 convention: Thomas Stoddart 
 1681–82: William Wilkie, commissar, bailie 
 1685: James Weir, merchant 
 1686: James Hair 
 1689 convention, 1689–1702: Thomas Hamilton, bailie  
 1702–07: William Carmichaell, advocate

See also
 List of constituencies in the Parliament of Scotland at the time of the Union

References

Constituencies of the Parliament of Scotland (to 1707)
Lanark
Constituencies disestablished in 1707
1707 disestablishments in Scotland
Politics of South Lanarkshire
History of South Lanarkshire